Business–IT alignment (B/I alignment) is a process in which a business organization uses information technology (IT) to achieve business objectives, such as improved financial performance or marketplace competitiveness.  Some definitions focus more on outcomes (The ability of IT to produce business value) that means (The harmony between IT and business decision-makers within the organizations); for example,  Alignment is the capacity to demonstrate a positive relationship between information technologies and the accepted financial measures of performance.

This alignment is in contrast to what is often experienced in organizations: IT and business professionals are unable to bridge the gap between themselves because of differences in objectives, culture, and incentives and a mutual ignorance of the other group's body of knowledge. This rift generally results in expensive IT systems that do not provide an adequate return on investment.  For this reason, the search for business–IT alignment is closely associated with attempts to improve the business value of IT investments.

Business–IT alignment integrates information technology into the strategy, mission, and goals of the organization. Key characteristics in order to achieve this alignment are:
The organization must view information technology as an instrument to transform the business. This includes exploring other revenue streams and integrating other facts of their business into each other. For example, using one central data warehouse to combine two separate, but partnering businesses.
An organization must hold customer service, both externally and internally at the utmost importance. Communication between the organization and its customers must be maintained.
An organization must rotate both IT and business professionals across different departments and job functions. They must have the knowledge and experience of both sides of the business so that understanding and communication are achieved. Once those three characteristics are achieved.
An organization must provide clear and specific goals to both IT and business employees. This will create the integration of both entities to achieve a common goal.
Ensure that IT and business employees understand how the company makes or loses money. This is important so that money is not carelessly poured into the IT department and there is no return on that investment.
Organizations must create a vibrant and inclusive company culture. There must not only be informational unity, but a company as a whole.

It is not unusual for business and IT professionals within an organization to experience conflict and in-fighting as a lack of mutual understanding and the failure to produce desired results leads to blaming and mistrust. The search for B/I alignment often includes efforts to establish trust between these two groups and a mechanism for consensus [decision-making].

B/I alignment and IT governance 

To achieve B/I alignment, organizations must make better decisions that take into account both business and IT disciplines. Establishing processes for decision-making and control is essentially what is meant by the term "governance"; so B/I alignment is closely related to information technology governance.

A commonly cited definition by IT Governance Institute is:IT governance is the responsibility of the board of directors and executive management. It is an integral part of enterprise governance and consists of the leadership and organizational structures and processes that ensure that the organization’s IT sustains and extends the organization’s strategies and objectives.

Also related to the effort for better decision-making, and therefore often part of B/I alignment - is the area of IT portfolio management, which has to do with decisions about which IT projects are funded and which are not.

B/I alignment and business transformation 

Ultimately, the value must come not just from the IT tools that are selected, but also from the way that they are used in the organization. For this reason, the scope of B/I alignment also includes business transformation, in which organizations redesign how work is accomplished in order to realize efficiencies made possible by new IT.  Thus, implementing IT to achieve its full potential for business value includes not only a technical component, but also an organizational change management component (see the Risk3 model below).

It is important to consider the overall value chain in technology development projects as the challenge for value creation is increasing with the competitiveness between organizations (Bird, 2010). The concept of value creation through technology is dependent upon the alignment of technology and business strategies. While the value creation for an organization is a network of relationships between internal and external environments, technology plays an important role in improving the overall value chain of an organization. This increase requires business and technology management to work as a creative, synergistic, and collaborative team instead of a purely mechanistic control instance. Technology can help the organization gain a competitive advantage within the industry it resides and generate performance at a greater value,  according to Bird.

Alignment models 

Henderson & Venkatraman's 1993 article can be seen as the starting point of business–IT alignment.

Typical EA Frameworks are used to achieve business–IT alignment, as these frameworks link business and technology layers of the organization over common threads.

TOGAF is a framework by Open Group which defines a very strong method of developing enterprise architecture. The method is called ADM (architecture development method)

Zachman EA framework is developed by John Zachman and it defines which artifacts enterprises need to develop to be able to organize themselves better. It is also a widely accepted framework in the industry.

In the Risk3 model, the objective of B/I alignment is to manage three separate risks associated with IT projects: technical risk (will the system function as it should?), organizational risk (will individuals within the organization use the system as they should?), and business risk (will the implementation and adoption of the system translate into business value?).  Business value is jeopardized unless all three risks are managed successfully.

See also 
 Technology alignment

References

Further reading 
 
 
 Van Grembergen, W., and S. De Haes, Enterprise Governance of IT: Achieving Strategic Alignment and Value, Springer, 2009.
 
 
 
 Service-oriented modeling framework (SOMF), provides a framework for business and IT alignment through transformation of business services into solution services

External links 
 The IT Governance Institute
 Strategic Alignment: Leveraging Information Technology for transforming organisations - IBM Systems Journal, vol32, NO1(-- broken URL)
 Paul Strassman
 Total Organizational Strategic Alliance Certifications
 Weill and Ross on IT governance
 ICT Standard for Management
 Enterprise Architecture: Business and IT Alignment
 Information Technology Alignment and Governance (ITAG) Research Institute (-- broken URL)

Business terms